Chak Noda is a town and Union Council of Swabi District in Khyber-Pakhtunkhwa.

References

Populated places in Swabi District
Union Councils of Swabi District